Ghanauli village is situated near Rupnagar in Rupnagar district in the state of Punjab in India. It was a jagir ruled by Virk Jats.

Location
Ghanauli lies on the bank of river Sutlej near Rupnagar. The village is located on National Highway 205 (Earlier NH 21) section between Rupnagar and Kiratpur Sahib in Punjab, on the border of the Rupnagar district and Solan district.

Rupnagar, Baddi, Kurali, Kiratpur Sahib are the nearby cities. Himachal Pradesh state line is only 4.5 kilometers from Ghanauli.

References

Villages in Rupnagar district